The Chonyi, also referred to as Achonyi (A person from this tribe may also be referred to as a Mchonyi), are one of the smaller tribes of the Mijikenda on the coast of Kenya.

Location 
Their populations can be found in the villages of Swerelanka - Mwembe Swere, Lutsangani, Chidutani, Kolongoni, Dzitsoni, Bungu, Bundacho, Ziani, Karimboni, Chasimba, Galanema, Mwele, Bodoi, Chigojoni, Dindiri, Junju, Katikirieni, Podzoni, Mwarakaya, Pingilikani, Vwevwesi, Mafisini, Ng'ombeni, Chizingo, Chikambala, Chengoni, Chije, Banda-ra-Salama, Gongoni, Bomani, Dindiri, Shaurimoyo, Mbomboni, chilobole and Mbuyuni. They are also found in recent settlements areas of Kilifi District like Chumani, Roka, Maweni, Vipingo, Takaungu and Mtwapa.

Origin 
According to a Chonyi myth, the Achonyi originated in Singwaya (or Shungwaya), which was to the north of the Somali coast. They were driven south by the Oromo until they reached their present locations along the ridge, where they built their kayas within a protective setting. 

The historical accuracy of this myth is a point of controversy between those who believe that the Mijikenda originated from a single point in the north and those who believe that they do not have a single origin, but migrated primarily from the south.

Culture 
Where "kiti" means chair in Swahili, "Kihi" is Giriama and "Chihi" is Chonyi. Similar, but recognizably different languages. Like the other Mijikenda tribes, the Chonyi live in settlements known as "Kaya." The original "Kaya Chonyi" is located on a forested hill top. In the center of the Kaya were shrines where the elders or "atumia" would pray to god or "Mulungu".

The Chonyi's traditional music, known as the Chiring'ong'o, features the xylophone, rare in Kenyan music.

Most Chongyi are farmers. They cultivate crops like maize and raise cattle. Some Chongyi also work in cotton, sugar cane, or sisal plantations.

Naming 
The naming of the chonyi people is symbolic, for example, MBEYU is a name of a girl mbeyu meaning seeds for planting. TSUMA means a boy who is a provider. NYAMVULA is a girl name meaning a rainy season, born during times of rains. MNYAZI being a girl's name meaning a sower. MOKOLI is a boy name meaning a person who is helpful. Names are also often repeated in the family. The names of the father's uncles and aunts would become the names of his children, this would be repeated with the mother's side of the family. 

Once the names from both sides of the family have been used, the parents can choose original names. Another interesting fact about names is that the first name of the father will become the last name of the rest of the family. An example would be if one's name is MUNGA JIRA, MUNGA would be the last name of his children and wife. Although it is a tradition to name your family in this way, it is a practice that is slowly fading.

References

Sources

External links 
 everyculture.com – Mijikenda

Mijikenda